KF Domozdova is an Albanian football club founded in 1923 and based in the small town of Prrenjas. KF Domozdova currently not competing in the senior football league.

History
The football club was founded in 1923.

External links
Second Division Standings and Stats
Albania Sport

Domozdova
Domzdova Prrenjas
1923 establishments in Albania
Prrenjas
Albanian Third Division clubs
Kategoria e Dytë clubs